The Balcony of the Moon (Spanish:El balcón de la Luna) is a 1962 Spanish musical comedy film directed by Luis Saslavsky and starring Carmen Sevilla, Lola Flores and Paquita Rico. Its critical and commercial failure illustrated the declining popularity of the Andalusian musical. one of the most popular Spanish genres of the 1950s.

The film's sets were designed by Sigfrido Burmann.

Cast
 Carmen Sevilla as Charo  
 Lola Flores as Cora  
 Paquita Rico as Pili  
 Leo Anchóriz 
 Paloma Valdés 
 María Asquerino as Amparo  
 Manuel Monroy 
 Manuel Zarzo 
 Virgilio Teixeira 
 Guillermo Marín as Indalecio de Quirós  
 Vicente Ros
 José Prada 
 Yelena Samarina 
 Josefina Serratosa 
 Juan Cortés 
 Adrián Ortega 
 Manuel de Juan 
 Nicolás D. Perchicot
 Julia Pachelo 
 Manuel Peiró 
 José María Tasso 
 Ángel Álvarez 
 Guillermo Méndez 
 Paco Perea 
 Isabel Perales 
 Julia Osete
 Jerónimo Montoro 
 Luis Rivera
 Miguel Merino 
 Joaquín Burgos 
Juana Cáceres 
 Fernando Sánchez Polack
 Carmen Pastor 
 José Villasante 
 Paloma Amaya

References

Bibliography
 Mira, Alberto. The A to Z of Spanish Cinema. Rowman & Littlefield, 2010.

External links 

1962 films
Spanish musical comedy films
1962 musical comedy films
1960s Spanish-language films
Films directed by Luis Saslavsky
Films produced by Cesáreo González
Films with screenplays by Antonio de Lara
Films produced by Ricardo Sanz
1960s Spanish films